Drepanotrema lucidum is a species of gastropods belonging to the family Planorbidae.

The species is found in Central and Southern Africa.

References

Planorbidae
Gastropods described in 1839